Shailesh J. Mehta School of Management (popularly known as SJMSOM or simply SOM) is a public business school and part of Indian Institute of Technology Bombay. SJMSOM was established in 1995. In 2000, the school was renamed to Shailesh J. Mehta School of Management, in honor of Dr. Shailesh J. Mehta who is a Mechanical Engineer graduate of IIT Bombay The director of school is S.N. Rao.

Academics  

SJMSOM conducts education and research in leadership, economics, marketing, entrepreneurship, organizational behavior, technology management, operations, strategy and other areas. The school offers a full-time degree course (Master of Business Administration), doctoral course and Management Development Programs (MDP) for company representatives. The school offers short-term programs in areas of management for the faculty of technical and management institutions during summer and winter seasons. Shailesh J. Mehta School of Management, IIT Bombay and Olin Business School, Washington University in St. Louis jointly offers Executive MBA (EMBA) degree program for working professionals.
Admissions are through CAT followed by group discussions and personal interview.

Rankings

The school was ranked 11 in India in the National Institutional Ranking Framework Management ranking in 2020.

Events

Avenues
Avenues is the annual international business school festival of IIT Bombay. .

Continuum
Continuum is the rolling seminar series at the school that covers recent management trends and brings together   personalities of the corporate and academic world.   They  are held in five fields: Systems, Finance, Human Resources, Marketing and Operations.

L!VE
L!VE is the school's e-magazine that was started in January 2006 with the theme 'Management Redefined'. "It was initially an IT and systematics magazine", but it has gone on to encompass all aspects of management and its disciplines.

External links

References

IIT Bombay
Business schools in Mumbai
Educational institutions established in 1995
1995 establishments in Maharashtra